This is a list of the tallest buildings in the world used primarily for education, defined as having an occupiable height that is 90% devoted to classroom, research, and educational administration use. It excludes dormitories.

List

  Nagy Andor: Az égboltot kémlelők varázstornya. In: Eszterházy Egyeteme : az egri Líceum képes albuma. Eger, 2017. p.82. ISBN 978-615-5621-62-8

Unknown height

Under construction

Notes

External links
List from Emporis

Educational buildings
Educational buildings